The 2014 Shenzhen Open (known as 2014 Shenzhen Gemdale Open for sponsorship reason) was a tennis tournament played on outdoor hard courts. It was the second edition of the Shenzhen Open, and was part of the WTA International tournaments of the 2014 WTA Tour. It took place at the Shenzhen Longgang Sports Center in Shenzhen, China, from 29 December 2013 to 5 January 2014.

Points and prize money

Point distribution

Prize money

1 Qualifiers prize money is also the Round of 32 prize money
* per team

Singles main draw entrants

Seeds

1 Rankings as of November 18, 2013.

Other entrants
The following players received wildcards into the singles main draw:
  Liu Fangzhou
  Zheng Saisai
  Vera Zvonareva

The following players received entry using a protected ranking into the singles main draw:
  Chan Yung-jan
  Aleksandra Wozniak

The following players received entry from the qualifying draw:
  Anna-Lena Friedsam
  Viktorija Golubic
  Lyudmyla Kichenok
  Risa Ozaki

Withdrawals
Before the tournament
  María Teresa Torró Flor → replaced by  Donna Vekić
  Dinah Pfizenmaier → replaced by  Nadiia Kichenok
During the tournament
  Vania King (right thigh injury)

Retirements
  Tímea Babos (gastrointestinal illness)

Doubles main draw entrants

Seeds

1 Rankings as of December 23, 2013

Other entrants
The following pairs received wildcards into the doubles main draw:
  Liu Fangzhou /  You Xiaodi
  Xu Shilin /  Sun Ziyue

Withdrawals
During the tournament
  Tímea Babos (gastrointestinal illness)

Champions

Singles

 Li Na def.  Peng Shuai, 6–4, 7–5

Doubles

 Monica Niculescu /  Klára Zakopalová def.  Lyudmyla Kichenok /  Nadiia Kichenok, 6–3, 6–4

References

External links
Official website

WTA Shenzhen Open
WTA Shenzhen Open
WTA Shenzhen Open
WTA Shenzhen Open
2014